Wildlife SOS is a TV show on Animal Planet, based in the UK's Wildlife Aid in Leatherhead, Surrey. The show has been running since 1996, produced by Simon Cowell's Wild Productions. The series can be found on Discovery Channel, Animal Planet, Channel 5 and DMAX. In 2014, the first made-for-web episodes of Wildlife SOS have started to appear on-line, made by the Wildlife Aid Foundation. Throughout Wildlife SOS, in addition to 'special' episodes filmed at wildlife centres on the world, the main focus of the series has been on the work of staff and volunteers at the WAF wildlife centre in Surrey.

Wildlife Aid

In 1996, following a fire that destroyed one third of the hospital complex, Cowell found his organisation reliant on media attention for its continued survival. Cowell was approached by representatives of the newly formed Animal Planet channel to produce a television series chronicling the drama of life in the wildlife rescue facility. The show experienced long-term success; it has been cited as "the longest-running animal rescue TV series" and continues to broadcast on Animal Planet, and various other channels owned by Discovery Communications. The TV series originally had 30-minute episodes but in 2012, this changed to a 60-minute format. The newest (2014) series of Wildlife SOS comprises shorter episodes available on-line on The WildlifeAidTV channel on YouTube.

Wild Productions
Wild Productions were the official makers of Wildlife SOS until 2013 when production was taken over directly by the Wildlife Aid Foundation itself. The writer, narrator and presenter of Wildlife SOS is Simon Cowell MBE who is also the chief executive of the Wildlife Aid Foundation.

See also
 The Bionic Vet, another Wild Productions' television series.

References

1996 British television series debuts
2014 British television series endings
2000s British television series
Animal Planet original programming
Channel 5 (British TV channel) original programming
ITV documentaries
Television series about animals
Television series by ITV Studios
Television shows produced by Meridian Broadcasting
English-language television shows